After the War may refer to:

 After the War (film), a 2017 French film
 After the War (Gary Moore album), 1989
 After the War (novel), a 1997 novel by Carol Matas
 After the War (video game), a 1989 video game
 After the War (Mono Inc. album)
 After the war (song), a World War I song